Reginald Johnson (born June 25, 1957) is an American retired professional basketball player.

A 6'9" forward/center from the University of Tennessee, Johnson played four seasons (1980–1984) in the National Basketball Association as a member of the San Antonio Spurs, Cleveland Cavaliers, Kansas City Kings, Philadelphia 76ers and New Jersey Nets.  He averaged 8.4 points per game in his NBA career and won a league championship with Philadelphia in 1983.  In February 2009, he was named to the University of Tennessee's "All-Century" Basketball team, which includes the 20 greatest players in school history.

External links

1957 births
Living people
African-American basketball players
American expatriate basketball people in Italy
American expatriate basketball people in Spain
American men's basketball players
Baloncesto León players
Basketball players from Atlanta
Basket Rimini Crabs players
Centers (basketball)
Cleveland Cavaliers players
Joventut Badalona players
Kansas City Kings players
Liga ACB players
New Jersey Nets players
Pallacanestro Trapani players
Philadelphia 76ers players
Power forwards (basketball)
San Antonio Spurs draft picks
San Antonio Spurs players
Tennessee Volunteers basketball players
21st-century African-American people
20th-century African-American sportspeople